Alfred Gordon Mursell (born 4 May 1949) is a retired British Anglican bishop and author. From 2005 to 2010, he was the Bishop of Stafford in the Church of England.

Mursell was educated at Ardingly College and Brasenose College, Oxford. Ordained in 1974 he began his career with a curacy at St Mary Walton, Liverpool and was then successively Vicar of St John's East Dulwich, a tutor at Wells Theological College, Team Rector of Stafford (1991–1999), Provost (1999–2002/3) and then Dean of Birmingham (2002/3–2005)  before his ordination to the episcopate as the suffragan Bishop of Stafford - a post he vacated in June 2010. A prolific author, he is also a keen hill walker. He is a member of the Athenaeum Club.

Publications
The Theology of the Carthusian Life (1988)
Out of the Deep (1989)
The Wisdom of the Anglo-Saxons (1996)
English Spirituality (2001)

Styles
 Gordon Mursell (1949–1974)
 The Revd Gordon Mursell (1974–1999)
 The Very Revd Gordon Mursell (1999–2005)
 The Rt Revd Gordon Mursell (2005–present)

Notes

References

1949 births
Living people
People educated at Ardingly College
Alumni of Brasenose College, Oxford
Associates of the Royal College of Music
Bishops of Stafford
People from Guildford
Provosts and Deans of Birmingham